Egypt–Jordan relations refers to the bilateral relations between the Hashemite Kingdom of Jordan and the Arab Republic of Egypt.
Since independence, the two nations have maintained good relations.  Both countries are members of the Arab League, GAFTA, the World Trade Organization, the Organisation of Islamic Cooperation, the Council of Arab Economic Unity and the United Nations.

Diplomatic relations 
Diplomatic relations between the Egyptian and Jordanian government have existed since Jordan became independent in 1946. 

On April 6, 1972, the Egyptian government severed relations in protest for a Jordanian plan for federation with the West Bank, which did not take PLO interests into consideration. These relations were restored on September 11, 1973. They were severed again in 1979, this time by the Jordanian government, in protest of the Israeli-Egyptian peace treaty. Following the outbreak of the Lebanon War of 1982, the US government put pressure on both governments to reach accommodation for the purpose of formulating a joint peace strategy vis-a-vis the Israeli government, and relations were restored on September 25, 1984.

In March 2021, the Prime ministers of the two countries signed seven agreements boosting the cooperation in many fields.

Borders 
Egypt and Jordan do not share a land border. They are separated by the Gulf of Aqaba and the Negev Desert to the east and southwest, with the latter's border with Jordan being 335 km (97 km with the West Bank and 238 km with Israel), while the border with Egypt is 265 km (including 11 km with the Gaza Strip and 254 km with Israel). The closest distance between two cities in the two countries is 11 km, the maritime distance between Jordan's Aqaba and Egypt's Taba, Separated by the Israeli city of Eilat through the Arabah and Taba Border Crossing.

Egypt Embassy 
The Egypt embassy is located in Amman.

 Ambassador Mohammed Samir Marzouq

Jordan Embassy 
The Jordan embassy is located in Cairo.

 Ambassador Amjad Adaileh

See also
Three-state solution

References